is a guided bus station in Moriyama-ku, Nagoya, Aichi Prefecture, Japan.  It was originally named Moriyama Shiminbyōin Station.  The name was changed on April 1, 2013, after the hospital for which it was named was privatized.

Lines
Nagoya Guideway Bus
Yutorīto Line (Station number: Y05)

Adjacent stations

|-
!colspan=5|Nagoya Guideway Bus

Railway stations in Japan opened in 2001
Railway stations in Aichi Prefecture